Alancık (literally "little field") is a Turkish place name that may refer to the following places in Turkey:

 Alancık, Çınar
 Alancık, Mecitözü
 Alancık, Sincik, a village in the district of Sincik, Adıyaman Province
 Alancık, Vezirköprü, a village in the district of Vezirköprü, Samsun Province
 Alancık, Yenice